Paper Giants: Magazine Wars is a 2013 Australian two-part television miniseries about 'golden years' of the glossy women's magazines and the battle to have the number one selling publication in Australia. The mini series is a sequel to the 2011 mini series Paper Giants: The Birth of Cleo.

Plot
Paper Giants: Magazine Wars is the story of the battle between Nene King (Mandy McElhinney) editor of Woman's Day and Dulcie Boling (Rachel Griffiths) editor of New Idea, from the rival Packer and Murdoch empires, who 'battled' to make their publication the number one seller in Australia. It charts the period from 1987 to 1997 with the rise of cheque-book journalism, the age of celebrity power, paparazzi, media moguls and the two remarkable women who helped make them.

Critical reception
Occasional writer for The Guardian Doug Anderson reported that the miniseries was an "absorbing and frequently rewarding drama"

Cast
Rachel Griffiths as Dulcie Boling
Mandy McElhinney as Nene King
Rob Carlton as Kerry Packer
Angus Sampson as Patrick Bowring
Khan Chittenden as Nick Trumpet
Caren Pistorius as Beth Ridgeway
Lucy Bell as Susan Duncan
Mark Lee as Richard Walsh
Socratis Otto as Peter Dawson
William Zappa as Rupert Murdoch
Alexander England as James Packer
John Wood as Ken Cowley
Steve Rodgers as Alan Bond
Sean Taylor as Al Dunlap
Rodger Corser as Harry M. Miller 
Rhys McConnochie as Lionel King 
Elspeth Ballantyne as Emily King 
Samuel Johnson as Paul Cavanagh

See also
Paper Giants: The Birth of Cleo

References

External links

Australian Broadcasting Corporation original programming
Period television series
Television shows set in New South Wales
Fiction set in the 1980s
Fiction set in the 1990s
English-language television shows
2010s Australian television miniseries
2013 Australian television series debuts
2013 Australian television series endings